This is a list of universities and colleges in Tanzania. The country has 43 universities. Universities and University Colleges are regulated by the Tanzania Commission for Universities.

Public universities

Private universities

Public university colleges

Private university colleges

See also
 List of Tanzanian university chancellors and vice-chancellors

References

External links
 Tanzania Commission for Universities

 
Tanzania
Universities
Tanzania